Antonio Muñoz (born 1 March 1951) is a former professional tennis player from Barcelona, Spain.

During his career, Muñoz reached seven ATP doubles finals, winning on three  occasions. He reached a career-high singles ranking of world No. 74 in 1973. As a junior, Muñoz won the boys' singles at the French Open in 1969.

Career finals

Doubles (3 titles, 4 runner-ups)

External links 
 
 
 

Tennis players from Catalonia
French Open junior champions
Spanish male tennis players
Tennis players from Barcelona
1951 births
Living people
Mediterranean Games silver medalists for Spain
Mediterranean Games medalists in tennis
Competitors at the 1971 Mediterranean Games
Grand Slam (tennis) champions in boys' singles